The EMD GP20C-ECO is a  B-B diesel-electric locomotive built by EMD. Although similar to the EMD GP22ECO, the GP20C-ECO follows Canadian Pacific's request for crashworthiness and EPA emission standards with the "C" in the designation denoting crashworthiness of the cab, frame, and fuel tank. Canadian Pacific (CP) requested relaxed emission standards (Tier 0+ instead of Tier 2) to cut costs.

GP20C-ECOs use just enough rebuilt components to designate them a rebuild. The GP20C-ECOs feature a new frame, fuel tank, long hood, and cab with CP providing trucks, prime mover, and alternator (along with many other smaller components), mainly from retired CP GP9s, that are rebuilt and reused in the locomotives. The units resemble a GP60's long hood and feature a snoot nose, which set the cab back slightly on the frame to make room for the additional length. As with the SD30C-ECOs, the GP20C-ECOs have all-LED lighting with the exception of the headlights and ditch lights.

The GP20C-ECOs should not be confused with a limited number of "GP20C" locomotives. These were former Great Northern GP20s rebuilt by Ziegler in 1989 (Ziegler was a Minneapolis-based Caterpillar dealer). The C in the name referred to their new Caterpillar engines. Only ten of these locomotives were produced.

Owners
A total of 130 GP20C-ECOs have been built for Canadian Pacific in three orders. The first order was for 30 locomotives numbered 2200-2229, the second order was for an additional 40 locomotives numbered 2230-2269, and the third order was for an additional 60 locomotives numbered 2270-2329.

References 

B-B locomotives
Diesel-electric locomotives of Canada
Diesel-electric locomotives of the United States
GP20C-ECO
Electro-Motive Division locomotives
Rebuilt locomotives
Railway locomotives introduced in 2013
Standard gauge locomotives of Canada
Standard gauge locomotives of the United States
Articles with dead external links from January 2023